Kiss Me Kate is a 1968 American TV film directed by Paul Bogart. It is an adaptation of the 1948 musical Kiss Me, Kate produced by Norman Rosemont, who had previously produced three adaptations of screen musicals. The production was broadcast as part of the Armstrong Circle Theatre series on ABC-TV.

Plot summary

Cast
 Robert Goulet as Fred Graham
 Carol Lawrence as Lilli Vanessi
 Jessica Walter as Lois Lane
 Michael Callan as Bill Calhoun
 Marty Ingels as Gangster
 Jules Munshin as Gangster

References

External links
 

1968 television films
1968 films
1968 musical films
American musical television films
Films directed by Paul Bogart
Films based on musicals
Films based on The Taming of the Shrew
1960s American films